A walrus is a large, flippered marine mammal.

Walrus may also refer to:

Music
 "Walrus", a song by the industrial metal band Ministry, from their 2004 album Houses of the Molé
 "Walrus", a song by the punk rock band Unwritten Law, from their 2005 album Here's to the Mourning

People
Barry White, popularly known as "The Walrus of Love"
Craig Stadler, professional PGA Tour golfer, popularly known as "The Walrus"

Places
 Walrus Islands, a group of craggy coastal islands in the Bering Sea
 Walrus Island (Bathurst Inlet, Nunavut), an island in Nunavut, Canada
 Walrus Island, Pribilof Islands, a small island in Alaska, United States

Transport

Aviation
 Supermarine Walrus, a British amphibious aircraft of World War II
 Westland Walrus, a British reconnaissance aircraft of the 1920s
 Walrus HULA, a heavy-lift hybrid airship studied by the American Defense Advanced Research Projects Administration (DARPA)

Maritime
 , two submarines of the Royal Netherlands Navy
 , the name of two ships and one submarine of the Royal Navy
 SS Walrus, a 19th-century vessel that operated in Australia as a floating, illegal moonshine still before being replaced by the legal Beenleigh Rum Distillery
 , three submarines of the United States Navy
 , a type of submarine currently operated by the Royal Netherlands Navy
 , a Hudson's Bay Company vessel, 1851–1857
 , a Hudson's Bay Company vessel, 1872–1876

Other transport
 Walrus (locomotive), a narrow–gauge, diesel locomotive on the Groudle Glen Railway
 An ITSO smartcard issued by Merseytravel in the UK

Other uses
 Wally Walrus, an animated character in several Woody Woodpecker films
 The Walrus, a Canadian general interest magazine
 Walrus (comics), a minor Marvel Comics supervillain of Spider-Man
 A storage service included with Eucalyptus software
 Walrus moustache, a style of moustache that resembles the whiskers of the walrus
 WLRS, known as "The Walrus" (1964–2000), a radio station in Louisville, Kentucky, with a frequency currently having call sign WXMA

See also
 Léon Walras, French economist
 "I Am the Walrus", a 1967 song by The Beatles
 "The Walrus and the Carpenter", a poem by Lewis Carroll that appeared in his book Through the Looking-Glass